Mary Arnaud "May" Naudain (October 12, 1880 – February 1923) was an American musical theatre actress and singer.

Early life 
Naudain was born in 1880 Burlington, Iowa, and raised in Omaha, Nebraska, the daughter of Thomas Nelson Naudain and Mary M. Calloway. Her father was a banker.

Career 
Naudain appeared on Broadway in Babes in Toyland (1903–1904), It Happened in Nordland (1904–1905), Victor Herbert's Concert (1905), His Majesty (1906), The Little Cherub (1906–1907), The Girl Behind the Counter (1907–1908), The Girls of Gottenberg (1908), and Katinka (1915–1916). She made a recording, in 1916, of the hit song "Rackety-Coo" from Katinka. In 1917 she sang on the vaudeville circuit with Anatole Friedland. She toured o\in vaudeville in 1918. In 1919 she sang on Broadway with The Society of American Singers in a production of The Gondoliers.

One writer commented on Naudain's "genuine wholesomeness and refreshing unstaginess". During World War I she gave benefit concerts and raised money for war bonds.

Personal life 
Naudain married banker Charles Henry "Harry" George in June, 1909. She died from a heart ailment in Jacksonville, Florida, in 1923, at the age of 41.

Notes

References

External links 

 

 A photograph of May Naudain in costume, in the Billy Rose Theatre Division Photograph File, New York Public Library Digital Collections.

1880 births
1923 deaths
People from Burlington, Iowa
American musical theatre actresses
Actresses from Omaha, Nebraska